Paolo Pulici (born 27 April 1950) is an Italian football manager and former footballer who played as a striker. With 172 goals in all competitions, he is the all-time record goalscorer for Torino.

He had several nicknames: amongst the most famous were Pupi and the one created for him by the journalist Gianni Brera, Puliciclone (a pun on his family name, Pulici, and Ciclone, Italian for "cyclone").
Plus, he shared with his teammate Francesco Graziani the collective nickname I gemelli del gol (Italian for "The Twins of Goal").
At international level, he represented Italy at two FIFA World Cups, first in 1974, and subsequently in 1978, where he helped the team to a fourth-place finish. Since 1990 he has taught the game of football at Sportiva Tritium 1908 in Trezzo sull'Adda, at the football school that bears his name.

In 2014, he was inducted into the Torino F.C. Hall of Fame; he was the first player to ever be elected and was included in the "Forwards" category.

Club career 

Pulici was born on 27 April 1950 in Roncello, small town at the time in the Province of Milan (now Province of Monza).
Initially courted by Internazionale, he was ultimately rejected as the club believed his left-foot only shooting could not match that of their striker Sandro Mazzola. Torino acquired from Legnano in 1967 and the then coach, Edmondo Fabbri, launched him as a starter in the 1968–69 season as a starter in Torino-Cagliari (0–0). In his first four seasons at Torino (three as starter), he played in 79 league games, but only scored nine goals due to technical shortcomings and his lack of composure in front of goal.

In 1972 the coach Gustavo Giagnoni excluded Pulici from the starting lineup for a period of two months, devoting him to technical refinement with the help of the coaches of the youth team. In 1972–73 he emerged as the top scorer in Serie A with 17 goals along with Gianni Rivera and Giuseppe Savoldi. He repeated this feat in 1974–75 (18 goals) and in 1975–76, when he scored 21 goals in the season won by Torino, played in tandem with strike-partner Francesco Graziani. The pair were nicknamed "i gemelli del gol" ("the goal twins"): Pulici's goal was decisive in the final round of the season against A.C. Cesena.

He played with Torino for 14 seasons, disputed 437 official games and scored 172 goals between league and cup competitions. In addition to the Scudetto won in 1975–76, he finished 2nd place in the league in 1976–77 and won a Coppa Italia trophy in 1971.

In subsequent years his number of goals diminished, with a minimum of three goals in the 1979–80 season, which coincided with the departure of Torino head coach Luigi Radice. In 1982, he was allowed to leave Torino for free, moving to Udinese; after a season in Friuli, he went to Fiorentina, with whom he ended his playing career.

International career

Pulici made his full international debut on 30 March 1973, in a 5–0 win over Luxembourg in a World Cup qualifier in Genoa. His first goals were a brace on 30 December 1975 in a 3–2 friendly win over Greece in Florence, his seventh cap. He then scored in his subsequent two matches, against Portugal and the United States.

In total, he played 19 matches and scored 5 goals for the Italy national football team. He made the squad for two World Cups (1974 and 1978), but did not enter the field of play in either tournament. Internationally, Pulici played in 19 games and scored 5 goals; often deployed in tandem with Graziani. Failing to repeat the performance offered at Torino, he was often replaced by Roberto Bettega.

Managerial career
After retiring, he joined the technical staff of Piacenza as assistant coach, after the Emilian club contacted him to resume athletic activities. From 1986 to 1988 he was at the side of coach Battista Rota, while in the season 1988–89 he reclaimed the role of assistant coach from Enrico Catuzzi and later Attilio Perotti.

Style of play
A prolific, tenacious, and opportunistic right-footed forward, Pulici was also adept at using his left foot. A fast, dynamic, and physically strong player, he was particularly gifted in the air and was known for his ability to score acrobatic goals; he was also an accomplished penalty kick taker.

Honours 
Torino
Serie A: 1975–76
Coppa Italia: 1970–71

Individual
Capocannoniere: 1972–73 (17 goals), 1974–75 (18 goals), 1975–76 (21 goals)
Torino F.C. Hall of Fame: 2014

References

External links

1950 births
Living people
Italian footballers
Italy under-21 international footballers
Italy international footballers
1974 FIFA World Cup players
1978 FIFA World Cup players
Torino F.C. players
Udinese Calcio players
ACF Fiorentina players
A.C. Legnano players
Serie A players
Serie C players
Sportspeople from the Metropolitan City of Milan
Association football forwards
Footballers from Lombardy